Vilu is a village in Guadalcanal, Solomon Islands.

References

Populated places in Guadalcanal Province